Abdullah bin Hamad bin Khalifa Al Thani (born 9 February 1988 in Doha) is the Deputy Emir of the State of Qatar and unofficial heir presumptive to Emir of Qatar.

Early life and education
Sheikh Abdullah is a son of the former Emir of Qatar Hamad bin Khalifa Al Thani and Sheikha Noora bint Khalid Al Thani. He graduated with a Bachelor of Science in Foreign Service from  Georgetown University in 2010. On 11 November 2014, Tamim bin Hamad Al Thani appointed Abdullah to the post of Deputy Emir, unofficially making him heir to the throne of Qatar. Emir Tamim is one day expected to appoint one of his own sons as Crown Prince.

Positions
Since 2018, he is the chairman of the Board of Trustees of QatarEnergy.

Sheikh Abdulla bin Hamad is the chairman of Board of Regents of Qatar University.

He is the vice-chairman of the Supreme Council for Economic Affairs and Investment.

Ancestry

References

External Links 

1988 births
Living people
Walsh School of Foreign Service alumni
Abdullah bin Hamad bin Khalifa Al Thani
Qatari Muslims
Sons of monarchs